Egletes (tropic daisy) is a genus of flowering plants in the family Asteraceae. It is native to South America, Mesoamerica, and the West Indies, with the range of one species barely crossing the US border into the extreme southern part of Texas.

 Species
 Egletes domingensis Cass. -  Hispaniola
 Egletes floribunda Poepp. - Amazonas State in Brazil
 Egletes florida Shinners - Venezuela, Guyana, Trinidad and Tobago
 Egletes humifusa Less. - Ecuador
 Egletes liebmannii Sch.Bip. ex Hemsl. - Guatemala, Honduras, Belize, Mexico
 Egletes obovata Benth. ex Oerst. - Colombia
 Egletes prostrata (Sw.) Kuntze - West Indies, Guyana, Venezuela, Colombia, northern Brazil
 Egletes repens Shinners - Venezuela, Colombia
 Egletes tenuifolia Cuatrec. - Colombia
 Egletes viscosa (L.) Less. - Texas, Mexico, Central America, West Indies, South America

References

Astereae
Asteraceae genera
Taxonomy articles created by Polbot